Howard Grotts (born January 12, 1993) is an American cross-country mountain biker. He rode in the cross-country event at the 2016 Summer Olympics. He also won the Leadville Trail 100 for 3 consecutive years from 2017 to 2019.

Major results
2014
3rd  U23 Cross Country World Championships
2015
1st  National Cross-country Championships
2016
1st  National Cross-country Championships
1st  National Short Track Mountain Bike Championships
2017
1st Leadville Trail 100
1st  National Cross-country Championships
2nd National Marathon Championships
2nd Bonelli Park XC
3rd Sea Otter Classic Cross Country
2018
1st Overall Cape Epic with Jaroslav Kulhavý
1st Leadville Trail 100
1st Missoula XC
2nd Cypress Sunshine Cup
2nd Sea Otter Classic Cross Country
2019
1st Leadville Trail 100

References

1993 births
Living people
American male cyclists
Cross-country mountain bikers
Cyclists at the 2016 Summer Olympics
Olympic cyclists of the United States
American mountain bikers
Cape Epic winners
People from Durango, Colorado